The Basketball Bundesliga Coach of the Year (German: Trainer des Jahres) is an annual Basketball Bundesliga award that goes to the league's best coach. The award was handed out for the first time in 1989–90 season, to Dirk Bauermann. Bauermann holds the record for most awards won, with four.

Winners

References

External links
German League official website 

Basketball Bundesliga awards